Mohd Shamirza bin Yusoff (born 7 June 1989) is a Malaysian footballer who plays for Terengganu in Malaysia Super League as a goalkeeper.

Born in Marang in the state of Terengganu. Shamirza always become the first choice goalkeeper and the youngest goalkeeper in the T-Team squad.

References

External links
 

1989 births
Living people
Malaysian footballers
Terengganu FC players
People from Terengganu
Malaysian people of Malay descent
Association football goalkeepers